The Polymeal is a diet-based approach to combatting heart disease, proposed in December 2004 by Oscar Franco, a Colombian public health scientist at the University Medical Centre in Rotterdam, Netherlands. Franco and his colleagues suggest the "Polymeal" as a natural alternative to the "Polypill", a multi-drug-based strategy for reducing heart disease.  The researchers used the same technique in the polypill paper: a statistical "meta-analysis" which combined the results of many previous studies. The paper, appearing in the BMJ's traditionally light-hearted Christmas issue, may be regarded as somewhat satirical, as noted in responses in the journal.

History
The study claims that adherence to the polymeal diet would delay the average onset of heart attack by nine years among men and by eight years among women.  Because cardiovascular disease is the #1 cause of mortality in first-world nations, this delay of heart failure would increase the average lifespan of men by six years and women by 5.5 years.

The researchers combined several food items already known to reduce the risk of heart disease:
 Red wine, which contains the antioxidant resveratrol, and alcohol, which some researchers think may help to reduce atherosclerosis by reducing clotting.
 Dark chocolate without dairy products
 Almonds
 Garlic
 Fish, particularly oily fish, which are sources of the Omega-3 fatty acids EPA and DHA.
 Fruits and vegetables

They suggest a person should consume, every day:
 150 mL of red wine (about one glass)
 100 g of dark chocolate
 400 g of fruits and vegetables
 2.7 g of garlic
 68 g of almonds
as well as 118 g of fish per day four times each week.

Since the Polymeal is based on principles of combating inflammation, this diet could be extended to the following foods:
 fruits and vegetables (as the staple)
 ginger root
 potatoes
 fish (other than catfish and tilapia)
 grass-fed beef (as opposed to grain-fed)
 chicken and eggs
 herbs and spices
 olive oil
 butter (ghee)
 coconut oil
 nuts
 dark chocolate (at least 85% chocolate)
 much water
 green tea
 red wine (dry and aged)
 turmeric (Curcuma longa)

References
 Franco OH, Bonneux L, de Laet C, Peeters A, Steyerberg EW, Mackenbach JP. The Polymeal: a more natural, safer, and probably tastier (than the Polypill) strategy to reduce cardiovascular disease by more than 75%. BMJ 2004;329:1447-1450. Fulltext (PDF). .

External links
 Alcohol, Wine, and Cardiovascular Disease From the American Heart Association
 Isn't this really reduction ad absurdum? Some pointers gleaned from the original article

Cardiovascular diseases
Diets